Pangasinan's 1st congressional district is one of the six congressional districts of the Philippines in the province of Pangasinan. It has been represented in the House of Representatives of the Philippines since 1916 and earlier in the Philippine Assembly from 1907 to 1916. The district consists of the western Pangasinan city of Alaminos and adjacent municipalities of Agno, Anda, Bani, Bolinao, Burgos, Dasol, Infanta, Mabini and Sual. It is currently represented in the 18th Congress by Arthur F. Celeste of the Nacionalista Party (NP).

Representation history

Election results

2019

2016

2013

2010

See also
Legislative districts of Pangasinan

References

Congressional districts of the Philippines
Politics of Pangasinan
1907 establishments in the Philippines
Congressional districts of the Ilocos Region
Constituencies established in 1907